CBC Bank is a heritage-listed former bank building at 16-20 Manning Street, Kiama, Municipality of Kiama, New South Wales, Australia. It was designed by Mansfield Bros and built by White and Coghill in 1880. It was added to the New South Wales State Heritage Register on 2 April 1999.

History 

The building was built in 1880 for the Commercial Banking Company of Sydney, with Mansfield Bros. as the architect and Sydney contractors White and Coghill as builders. It was described at its establishment by The Kiama Independent and Illawarra and Shoalhaven Advertiser as "likely to be one of the principal ornaments of Kiama".

The CBC Bank shifted to new premises in Terralong Street  1969.

In 1979 Mr & Mrs Roslyn McKinnon, owners of the CBC Bank, nominated it for a Permanent Conservation Order. At that time the front of the building was occupied by a solicitors practice, the rear was occupied by a veterinary surgeon and the upstairs was let as a flat. The owners of the property were seeking protection under the Heritage Act for the building with a view to attracting rating and taxation benefits.

At its meeting of 14 January 1981 the Heritage Council recommended that a Permanent Conservation Order be placed over the former CBC Bank, Kiama.

A Permanent Conservation Order was placed over the property on 17 July 1981.

It was transferred to the State Heritage Register on 2 April 1999.

It now houses IT firm DropPoint.

Description 
The building falls within the Mansfield Genre of substantial and impressive two-storey Italianate-style banks consisting of ground floor banking chambers with first floor manager's residence. Materials are rendered brick and slate, and the building retains much of its original detail and joinery, little compromised by the various uses to which the former bank has been put.

The building retains much of its original detail and joinery.

Heritage listing 

The former CBC Bank was constructed in 1880 to designs of Mansfield Bros for Commercial Banking Company of Sydney Ltd. It comes within the Mansfield genre of substantial and impressive two-storey Italianate style banks. The building retains much of its original detail and joinery. Situated adjacent to the Bank of New South Wales building, also by Mansfield Bros and near Kiama Post Office and other early commercial and civic premises, the former CBC bank is an important component of Kiama's townscape and a reminder of the town's elegant past.

CBC Bank was listed on the New South Wales State Heritage Register on 2 April 1999 having satisfied the following criteria.

The place is important in demonstrating the course, or pattern, of cultural or natural history in New South Wales.

The former CBC Bank was constructed  to designs of Mansfield Bros for Commercial Banking Company of Sydney Ltd.

The place is important in demonstrating aesthetic characteristics and/or a high degree of creative or technical achievement in New South Wales.

It comes within the Mansfield genre of substantial and impressive two-storey Italianate style banks. Situated adjacent to the Bank of New South Wales building, also by Mansfield Bros and near Kiama Post Office and other early commercial and civic premises, the former CBC bank is an important component of Kiama's townscape and a reminder of the town's elegant past.

See also

References

Bibliography

Attribution 

New South Wales State Heritage Register
Kiama, New South Wales
Buildings and structures in New South Wales
Former bank buildings in New South Wales
Articles incorporating text from the New South Wales State Heritage Register